Air Paradise International was an airline based in Denpasar, Bali, Indonesia. It operated services to destinations in Australia, South Korea and Taiwan, from its main base at Ngurah Rai Airport, Denpasar. On 1 December 2005, the airline announced that it was ceasing operations due to a downturn in traffic, following terrorist bombings on the island in October 2005. In February 2007, the Indonesian Transportation Ministry delayed license revocation of 11 major airlines, including Air Paradise, to give restructuring opportunities to the operators. Air Paradise was considering re-launching services in March 2007. However, 3 years later, after ceasing operations in November 2005, the airline filed for bankruptcy, 5 months after another of its competitors (Adam Air) had filed for bankruptcy.

History 

The airline was established in June 2002 and started operations on 16 February 2003 with services to Perth in Australia from Denpasar, Bali. On 27 December 2004, services began to Osaka, Japan. All services were suspended on 1 December 2005 following a downturn if traffic after the October 2005 terrorist attacks in Bali in result of over 100 fatalities. In June 2006, the website was still available, announcing negotiations to recapitalize the airline. Air Paradise was using A300's, A310's and leased 737-800's on flights to Melbourne, Sydney and Perth mostly for tourists. A major competitor on the Denpasar route was Garuda Indonesia. In November 2008, Air Paradise filed for bankruptcy after failing to re-launch operations and it's the 2nd airline to file for bankruptcy in 5 months after Adam Air.

Services 

Air Paradise operated services to the following international scheduled destinations in January 2005: Adelaide, Brisbane, Melbourne, Osaka, Perth, Seoul and Sydney.

Fleet 

The Air Paradise operated the following aircraft during its operation:

References 

Suspension of services announcement
Service re-launch

External links

Air Paradise International via archive.org
Air Paradise International Fleet Detail
Official website

Defunct airlines of Indonesia
Airlines established in 2002
Airlines disestablished in 2005
2002 establishments in Indonesia
2005 disestablishments in Indonesia